WYFU (88.5 FM) is a Bible Broadcasting Network affiliated broadcast radio station licensed to Masontown, Pennsylvania, serving south-western Pennsylvania and northern North-Central West Virginia.

WYFU is owned and operated by the Bible Broadcasting Network.

External links
 WYFU Online
 

Bible Broadcasting Network
Radio stations established in 1998
YFU